William Wallace (1893 – 8 November 1917), sometimes known as Billy Wallace, was an English professional footballer who played in the Football League for Manchester City and Bolton Wanderers as an outside left.

Personal life 
In 1915, during the second year of the First World War, Wallace enlisted as a sapper in the Royal Engineers. He was killed during the Battle of Passchendaele on 8 November 1917 and is commemorated on the Ploegsteert Memorial.

Career statistics

References

1893 births
1917 deaths
People from Blaydon-on-Tyne
Footballers from Tyne and Wear
English footballers
Association football outside forwards
Newburn F.C. players
Manchester City F.C. players
Bolton Wanderers F.C. players
English Football League players
British Army personnel of World War I
Royal Engineers soldiers
British military personnel killed in World War I